Thornhill Primary School is the name of several schools.

In the United Kingdom:
 Thornhill Primary School, Rotherham
 Thornhill Primary School, Southampton
 Thornhill Primary School, Stirlingshire
 Thornhill Primary School, Cardiff
 Thornhill Primary School, Egremont, Cumbria
 Thornhill Primary School, Shildon, County Durham
 Thornhill Primary School, Islington, London

In Botswana:
 Thornhill Primary School (Gaborone, Botswana)

In Canada:
 Thornhill Primary School (Terrace, British Columbia)

See also:
 Lady Joanna Thornhill's Endowed Primary School, Wye, Kent, England